Antepirrhoe semiatrata, the black-banded carpet moth, is a species of geometrid moth in the family Geometridae.

The MONA or Hodges number for Antepirrhoe semiatrata is 7210.

References

Further reading

External links

 

Hydriomenini
Articles created by Qbugbot
Moths described in 1881